Eliza "Izzy" Wright (née Chilcott; born 9 November 1990) is an Australian professional basketball player.

College
Wright began her college career at Pensacola Junior College in Pensacola, Florida, playing for the Pirates in the NJCAA's Region 8. After two seasons with Pensacola, Wright then went on and transferred to the University of San Diego in San Diego, California, playing with the Toreros in the West Coast Conference of NCAA Division I.

Statistics 

|-
|2008–09
| align="left" |Pensacola
|23
|–
|–
|.557
|.333
|.903
|1.6
|1.6
|1.6
|0.1
|1.1
|5.9
|-
|2009–10
| align="left" |Pensacola
|28
|–
|–
|.483
|.311
|.760
|2.9
|1.7
|1.4
|0.0
|1.3
|10.2
|-
|2010–11 
| align="left"|San Diego
|31
|5
|–
|.370
|.333
|.777
|2.6
|0.8
|0.6
|0.3
|1.3
|2.4
|-
|2011–12
| align="left"|San Diego
|35
|33
|–
|.437
|.250
|.714
|6.4
|2.0
|1.8
|0.2
|2.0
|6.6
|-
|Career
|
|117
|38
|–
|.463
|.298
|.776
|3.6
|1.5
|1.3
|0.1
|1.5
|6.2

Career

WNBL
In 2012, Wright began her professional career, joining her hometown side, Logan Thunder for the 2012–13 season.

In 2015, after strong showings with the Hobart Chargers in the SEABL, Wright was picked up by the newly rebranded Perth Lynx for 2015–16. This season saw Wright make her WNBL Finals debut, with a trip to the Grand Final, where the Lynx went down 0–2 to Townsville. Wright played in 26 games on the 2015–16 season, averaging 2.2 points and 1.9 rebounds per game.

In 2020, Wright returned to the WNBL after several years away from the league, signing with the Melbourne Boomers for the 2020 season. 

In April 2022, Wright was part of the Melbourne Boomers championship team and was voted the Boomers Player's Player of the Year

References

1990 births
Living people
People from Tweed Heads, New South Wales
Guards (basketball)
Australian women's basketball players
Australian expatriate basketball people in the United States
University of San Diego alumni
San Diego Toreros women's basketball players
Logan Thunder players
Perth Lynx players
Melbourne Boomers players
Basketball players from New South Wales